Slade Hall is a small Elizabethan manor house on Slade Lane in Longsight, Manchester, England. An inscription above the porch dates the building to 1585.

The mansion is recorded in the National Heritage List for England as a designated Grade II* listed building, first listed on 25 February 1952.

History
From about the mid-13th century until the reign of Elizabeth I, it was held by a family who adopted Slade as their surname. They sold the estate to the Siddall family, who in 1583 began construction of Slade Hall. Work was completed by 1585, as evidenced by an inscription on a beam over the porch, which also has the initials of the builder, E. S., for Edward Siddall. The Siddals and their descendants occupied the house for the next 300 years.

Slade Hall was offered for sale at auction in 2002, and was bought by property developer Mel Evans for £527,000. The hall was purchased as already restored and divided into shared accommodation for 14 residents. It was, in the early 1990s,  the registered office of the Partington Housing Association.

Description
Slade Hall is an Elizabethan timber-framed house on a stone base, built to a hall and cross-wing plan. There are some brick extensions to the rear, a slate roof, and a 19th-century wing added to the right of the original. It is of two storeys, the upper one jettied.

The stud-and-rail timber frame has zig-zag herring-bone bracing between the constructional timbers. A porch in the angle between the main gable and the southern wing has painted lozenges resembling quatrefoils. The main hall has two first-floor four-light wooden mullioned casements; the range to the left has a restored fourteen-light mullion and transom window, with a three-light window immediately to its right. The range of the cross-wing on the right has ten-light mullion and transom windows at the ground floor and twelve-lights at the first floor.

The interior has some exposed timber work showing the house's original construction. Plaster friezes are still visible in the first-floor chamber above the hall, described by architectural historian Norman Redhead as crude 16th-century stuff. They depict mainly heraldic motifs, including the Elizabethan coat of arms and the Siddall family's crest, but also an "entertaining" hunting scene.

See also

Grade II* listed buildings in Greater Manchester
Listed buildings in Manchester-M13

References
Notes

Citations

Bibliography

Country houses in Greater Manchester
Houses in Manchester
Grade II* listed buildings in Manchester